Alexander Pereira Cardoso (born March 15, 1975), most commonly known as Alex Mineiro, is a former Brazilian football striker.

Club statistics

Honours

Club
Cruzeiro
Copa Libertadores: 1997
Minas Gerais State Championship: 1997

Atlético Paranaense
Brazilian Série A: 2001
Paraná State Championship: 2001, 2005

Palmeiras
São Paulo State Championship: 2008

Individual
 Bola de Ouro: 2001
 Campeonato Paulista Top Scorer: 2008
 Campeonato Brasileiro Série A Team of the Year: 2008

References

External links
 

CBF 

1975 births
Living people
Brazilian footballers
Brazilian expatriate footballers
Club Athletico Paranaense players
Expatriate footballers in Japan
Expatriate footballers in Mexico
Cruzeiro Esporte Clube players
Kashima Antlers players
América Futebol Clube (MG) players
Esporte Clube Vitória players
Tigres UANL footballers
Clube Atlético Mineiro players
Sociedade Esportiva Palmeiras players
J1 League players
Grêmio Foot-Ball Porto Alegrense players
Esporte Clube Bahia players
Liga MX players
Campeonato Brasileiro Série A players
Association football forwards
Footballers from Belo Horizonte